Naktala High School  is a school located at Naktala, Kolkata, India. The all boys school is affiliated with the West Bengal Board of Secondary Education for Madhyamik Pariksha (10th Board exams), and to the West Bengal Council of Higher Secondary Education for Higher Secondary Examination (12th Board exams). The school was established in 1951.

See also
Education in India
List of schools in India
Education in West Bengal

References

External links 
 

Boys' schools in India
Educational institutions established in 1951
1951 establishments in West Bengal